Shelomovo is a rural locality (a village) in Zheleznodorozhnoye Rural Settlement, Sheksninsky District, Vologda Oblast, Russia. The population was 63 as of 2002.

Geography 
Shelomovo is located 22 km southwest of Sheksna (the district's administrative centre) by road. Durasovo is the nearest rural locality.

References 

Rural localities in Sheksninsky District